Steinmetz is an unincorporated community in Howard County, in the U.S. state of Missouri.

History
Steinmetz was platted in 1882. and named after W. P. Steinmetz, the original owner of the town site. A post office called Steinmetz was established in 1879, and remained in operation until 1933.

References

Unincorporated communities in Howard County, Missouri
Unincorporated communities in Missouri